Eucalyptus mimica is a species of mallet that is endemic to a small area of Western Australia. It has smooth, shiny bark, linear to narrow elliptical leaves held erect, flower buds in groups of three and conical fruit with ribbed sides.

Description
It has smooth, shiny green bark that is copper-coloured when fresh. This species is similar to E. steedmanii but has smaller buds and fruit.

Taxonomy
Eucalyptus mimica was first formally described in 2002 by Ian Brooker and Stephen Hopper in the journal Nuytsia, from specimens collected by Brooker south of Newdegate. The specific epithet alludes to the similarity of this species to E. steedmanii.

In the same journal, Brooker and Hopper described two subspecies and the names have been accepted by the Australian Plant Census:
 Eucalyptus mimica subsp. continens Brooker & Hopper 
 Eucalyptus mimica Brooker & Hopper subsp. mimica<ref name="APC2">{{cite web |title=Eucalyptus mimica subsp. continens |url=https://biodiversity.org.au/nsl/services/apc-format/display/168288 |website=Australian Plant Census |access-date=7 November 2019}}</ref> The subspecies differ in the colour of their bark, the form of the operculum and habitat preferences. Subspecies mimica grows in more saline environments.

Distribution and habitat
This mallet is found on flats and in depressions around salt lakes, growing in sandy-clay soils. Subspecies mimica occurs from east of Pingrup to south of Newdegate. Subspecies continens is only known from roadsides and private land south of Newdegate.

Conservation status
Both subspecies have been given a priority status by the Government of Western Australia Department of Parks and Wildlife. Subspecies continens is listed as "Priority One", meaning that it is known from only one or a few locations that are potentially at risk. Subspecies mimica'' is classified by the Government of Western Australia as "Priority Three", meaning that it is poorly known and known from only a few locations but is not under imminent threat.

See also
List of Eucalyptus species

References

Eucalypts of Western Australia
Trees of Australia
mimica
Myrtales of Australia
Plants described in 2002
Taxa named by Ian Brooker
Taxa named by Stephen Hopper